Zwartberg Airfield  is a public use airport located  north-northeast of Genk, Limburg, Belgium.

See also
 List of airports in Belgium

References

External links 
 
 Airport record for Zwartberg Airfield at Landings.com

Airports in Limburg (Belgium)
Genk